Hacıqədirli or Gadzhi-Kadyrli or Gadzhi-Kadirli or Gadzhykadirli may refer to:
Hacıqədirli, Agsu, Azerbaijan
Hacıqədirli, Shamakhi, Azerbaijan